Ponosakan is an Austronesian language spoken in the vicinity of the town of , North Sulawesi, Indonesia. This language is almost extinct, with only four fluent speakers left as of November 2014.

Classification 
The locals in North Sulawesi often falsely identify Ponosakan as a Minahasan language. However, there is no doubt among scholars that this language actually belongs to the Gorontalo–Mongondow subgroup. The Gorontalo–Mongondow languages are commonly classified as a part of the Philippine subfamily; Robert Blust specifically includes it in the Greater Central Philippine languages, alongside—among others—Tagalog and Visayan languages.

In comparison to other Gorontalo–Mongondow languages, Ponosakan is relatively conservative in terms of phonology and structure.

Demography and distribution 
Ponosakan is spoken at the eastern end of Gorontalo–Mongondow languages' distribution. Before World War II, Ponosakan was the most spoken language not only in Belang, but also in several other settlements around it. But even in the 1920s, its number of speakers was already in decline. Influx of migrants from other areas also altered the region's demography; when World War II started, already half of Belang residents were newcomers who did not speak Ponosakan. By the second half of the 20th century, "virtually no ethnic Ponosakans were learning the language anymore".

In November 2014, there were reportedly only four elderly people who could still speak Ponosakan fluently. Ponosakan has the fewest speakers among the Gorontalo–Mongondow languages.

Phonology 
There are 16 consonants and 5 vowels in Ponosakan. In addition, the phoneme  only occurs in loanwords.

Grammar

Pronouns 
As with other Philippine languages, pronouns in Ponosakan are distinguished by case (nominative, genitive, and oblique); number (singular and plural); and, for the first person plural pronouns, clusivity (inclusive and exclusive). Other than the contrast between the singular and plural forms, Ponosakan also exhibits "count forms" for second and third person pronouns. These forms are always followed by a number, as in  'the three of them' and  'the four of them'. In contrast, plural forms cannot be followed by a number. Both the count and plural forms can be used to represent any number of people, although there is a preference towards using the count forms for smaller numbers.

Case markers 
There are three cases in Ponosakan: nominative, genitive, and oblique. Each case has its own marker, although the same marker is used for both nominative and genitive cases in common nouns.

Demonstratives 
There are three root words for demonstratives in Ponosakan: (1)  'near speaker (whether or not also near addressee)', (2)  'near addressee (but not speaker)', and (3)  or  'far from both speaker and addressee'. Examples of usage:
{|
| || 'What's this? (near speaker, or near both speaker and addressee)'
|-
| || 'What's that? (near addressee but not speaker)'
|-
| || 'What's that? (far from both)'
|}

Interrogatives 
There are at least 16 interrogative words in Ponosakan. The form  by itself means 'what', but this root form can also be found in  'when',  'why',  'how much', and  'how many times'. The form  when used in isolation means 'where' (used after verbs only), but this base can also be found in  'where',  'how (manner)', and  'which'. The only interrogative word which doesn't show any of the above base forms is  'why'.

Negators 
Negation in Ponosakan is found in several forms. The word  'no' negates verbs, adjectives, existence or location. The word  'don't!' is used to negate commands. The word  'not' negates nouns and equational sentences.

References

Footnotes

Bibliography

External links 
 Ponosakan word list from the Austronesian Basic Vocabulary Database
 Ponosakan Talking Dictionary from the Living Tongues Institute for Endangered Languages—contains 382 separate entries with an audio recording for each of them.

Gorontalo–Mongondow languages
Languages of Sulawesi